1034 Mozartia, provisional designation , is a stony asteroid from the inner regions of the asteroid belt, approximately 8 kilometers in diameter. It was discovered on 7 September 1924, by Soviet Vladimir Albitsky at Simeiz Observatory on the Crimean peninsula, and named after Wolfgang Amadeus Mozart.

Orbit and classification 

Mozartia orbits the Sun in the inner main-belt at a distance of 1.7–2.9 AU once every 3 years and 6 months (1,268 days). Its orbit has an eccentricity of 0.26 and an inclination of 4° with respect to the ecliptic. The body's observation arc begins with its official discovery observation in 1924.

Physical characteristics 

In the SMASS classification, Mozartia is a common S-type asteroid.

Diameter and albedo 

According to the survey carried out by NASA's Wide-field Infrared Survey Explorer with its subsequent NEOWISE mission, Mozartia measures 7.919 kilometers in diameter and its surface has an albedo of 0.250.

Lightcurves 

As of 2017, no rotational lightcurve of Mozartia has been obtained. The body's rotation period and shape remain unknown.

Naming 

This minor planet was named after the influential Austrian composer Wolfgang Amadeus Mozart (1756–1791). The official  was published by the Minor Planet Center in November 1952.

References

External links 
 Asteroid Lightcurve Database (LCDB), query form (info )
 Dictionary of Minor Planet Names, Google books
 Asteroids and comets rotation curves, CdR – Observatoire de Genève, Raoul Behrend
 Discovery Circumstances: Numbered Minor Planets (1)-(5000) – Minor Planet Center
 
 

001034
Discoveries by Vladimir Albitsky
Named minor planets
001034 Mozartia
001034
19240907